Swapnil More (born 14 June 1990) is an Indian cricketer. He made his Twenty20 debut for Services in the 2016–17 Inter State Twenty-20 Tournament on 2 February 2017.

References

External links
 

1990 births
Living people
Indian cricketers
Services cricketers
Cricketers from Maharashtra